eDumbe Local Municipality is an administrative area in the Zululand District of KwaZulu-Natal in South Africa. The municipality is named after the Dumbe mountain.

Only 23% of the municipality’s population live in an urban area while 77% live in the rural hinterland of the municipality. This factor has severe implications on actual service delivery and the cost thereof. Most settlements developed organically and are unplanned, lack basic services and facilities and provide limited opportunities for economic development.

Main places
The 2001 census divided the municipality into the following main places:

Politics 

The municipal council consists of nineteen members elected by mixed-member proportional representation. Ten councillors are elected by first-past-the-post voting in ten wards, while the remaining nine are chosen from party lists so that the total number of party representatives is proportional to the number of votes received. In the election of 1 November 2021, the National Freedom Party won a plurality of seats.

The following table shows the results of the election.

References

External links
 http://www.edumbe.gov.za/

Local municipalities of the Zululand District Municipality